The  St. Hyacinth's Cathedral  also called Cathedral of St. Hyacinthe the Confessor is a religious building of the Catholic Church which was built in 1880. It is located in Saint-Hyacinthe, Quebec, in eastern Canada, it is the main church of the diocese of the same name. It is named in honour of St. Hyacinth of Poland.

History

The Roman Catholic Diocese of Saint-Hyacinthe was erected 8 June 1852. Jean-Charles Prince, former coadjutor of Montreal, was named the first bishop. At first, the old seminary building was used as a cathedral and residence. A red brick chapel-cathedral was hastily built near the Hôtel-Dieu. During the funeral of Bishop Prince in 1860, the pro-cathedral began to show signs of weakness under the weight of the crowd.

Charles La Rocque became bishop in March 1866. Realizing that the debts of his cathedral called for unusual measures, he closed the episcopal palace and retired with his staff to Saint-Mathieu-de-Beloeil, where he combined the duties of bishop and pastor. 

The construction of the current building was undertaken by Bishop Louis-Zéphirin Moreau, with the money saved by the economy of his predecessor. Its architect was Adolphe Lévesque, who fulfilled a contract for $50,000. It was named in honour of Dominican confessor St. Hyacinth (Saint Hyacinthe). Moreau is buried at the cathedral.

In September 2022, Bishop Christian Rodembourg presided over the formal dedication of the cathedral.

Architecture 
Lévesque designed the building in Romanesque style. The facade proved too heavy for the clay soil on which it rests. A restoration took place in 1908 by the architects Maurice Perrault and Albert Mesnard. They secured the foundation, and replaced the original square towers with two slender bell towers. the Stations of the Cross date from 1913.

A second renovation in 1942 removed the side balconies and installed a new baptistery. After the Second Vatican Council various elements of the choir were rearranged; Czechoslovakian glass chandeliers were hung, replacing neon light fixtures. In 1975, the tomb of Bishop Moreau was installed in the left transept of the cathedral. Additional repairs were made in 1998-1999 to the forecourt and masonry work.

Interior
The painting in the vault of the choir which represents the Eternal Father is by a work of Ozias Leduc. In 1853 by Mgr Ignace Bourget, bishop of Montreal, presented Saint-Hyacinthe with a harmonium that was used until the installation of the Casavant organ, opus 8, in 1885.

See also
Catholic Church in Canada

References

External links
 Cathedral website

Roman Catholic cathedrals in Quebec
Buildings and structures in Saint-Hyacinthe
Roman Catholic churches completed in 1880
Churches in Montérégie
19th-century Roman Catholic church buildings in Canada